The MOWA Band of Choctaw Indians is a state-recognized tribe, located in southwest Alabama, with a population largely based in southern Washington County and some membership in northern Mobile County. 

The term MOWA is a portmanteau of Mobile and Washington Counties. They were formerly named the Mobile-Washington County Band of Choctaw Indians of South Alabama. 

The MOWA Band of Choctaw claims to descend from Choctaw people who evaded Indian Removal in the 1830s and remained in Alabama. The Cherokee Nation includes the MOWA Band of Choctaw on its list of fraudulent tribes.

Petition for federal recognition 
The MOWA Band of Choctaw Indians sent a letter of intent for federal recognition in 1983. They completed their petition for federal acknowledgment in 1988. Kevin Gover (Pawnee), then Assistant Secretary for Indian Affairs, and the US Department of the Interior denied their petition in 1997 and again in 1999. 

The final determination stated that "the Alabama group did not descend from the historical Choctaw tribe or from any one of the other five tribes it claimed."

It went on to state, "The Final Determination noted that the petitioning group is derived from two core families that were resident in southwestern Alabama by the end of the first third of the nineteenth century. All persons on the petitioner's membership (3,960) roll descend from these two families. About one percent of the members have documented Indian heritage but it derives from an ancestor whose grandchildren married into the petitioning group after 1880, and from another individual who married into the petitioning group in 1904. This insignificant Indian ancestry for a few individual members does not satisfy the criterion that the group as a whole descends from a historical tribe. The MOWA ancestors, most of whom were well documented, were not identified as American Indians or descendants of any particular tribe in the records made in their own life times."

The MOWA Band of Choctaw requested a reconsideration of the Final Determination in 1998, and the US Department of the Interior reaffirmed its declining of the MOWA petition in 1999, stating, "The Final Determination concluded that there was no evidence that established Choctaw or other Indian ancestry of 99 percent of the MOWA membership. Rather, the evidence tended to disprove Indian ancestry."

State recognition 
In 1979, the State of Alabama formally acknowledged the MOWA Band of Mobile and Washington County as a state-recognized tribe, through legislation introduced by State Representative J. E. Turner. 

MOWA members Galas Weaver and Framon Weaver became active leaders in Indian affairs in the state of Alabama. Galas Weaver was instrumental to the formation of the Alabama Indian Affairs Commission, created by the 1984 Davis-Strong Act.

Reservation 

The MOWA is a rare state-recognized tribe with a reservation. The MOWA Reservation is a few miles west of US 43. It is 160 acres in size.

Organization
The organization descends from "three core families, the Weavers, Byrds, and Reeds. ... these families generally were classed as nonwhites, either as 'free persons of color' or black in the antebellum period, with certain individuals listed in government documents as white. Socially they were not accepted by local whites, and because they were free the MOWA ancestors were set apart from the enslaved blacks of the area," as historian Mark Edwin Miller writes. The isolated rural group increasingly identified as being American Indian and Choctaw in the 1960s. 

Under the leadership of Framon Weaver in 1979, they formally organized as a nonprofit organization in Alabama,  the MOWA Band of Choctaw Indian Commission.

As of 2019, the commission's administration includes:
 Lebaron Byrd, CEO
 John Byrd, treasurer
 Kesler Weaver, chairman.

The MOWA Choctaw Cultural Center in Mount Vernon is subordinate to the MOWA Band of Choctaw Indian Commission. It was formed in 2003 as an A90: Arts Service Organization. Lebaron Byrd is its president.

Activities 
The MOWA operates a health clinic and a museum. The MOWA hosts an annual powwow each year.

Health concerns 
Members of the MOWA Band of Choctaw Indians have a high frequency of Marinesco–Sjögren syndrome, a rare autosomal recessive disorder which can lead to intellectual disability, muscle weakness, and balance and coordination problems. They are the only known population in the United States to suffer from the rare disease.

Proposed legislation 
In 2022, US Senator Richard C. Shelby (R-AL) introduced S.3443 MOWA Band of Choctaw Indians Recognition Act to extend federal recognition to the MOWA Choctaw. The bill has been referred to the Senate Committee on Indian Affairs.

Notes

References

External links
 
 Alabama Indian Affairs Commission

1979 establishments in Alabama
African-American history of Alabama
Choctaw heritage groups
Cultural organizations based in Alabama
Mobile County, Alabama
Native American tribes in Alabama
Non-profit organizations based in Alabama
State-recognized tribes in the United States
Washington County, Alabama